Back at One may refer to:

 Back at One (album), a 1999 album by Brian McKnight
 "Back at One" (song), a 1999 song by Brian McKnight from the album of the same name